Texas, Adios (Italian: Texas, addio) is a 1966  Italian/Spanish international co-production Spaghetti Western film directed by Ferdinando Baldi and starring Franco Nero. It is often referenced in connection with Django, also starring Nero, and although was referred to as Django 2 in some countries, it is not considered a sequel. The film is mostly remembered as a lesser known Spaghetti Western.

Plot
Although technically a Spaghetti Western, the plot of Texas, Adios plays more like a traditional American western film. Franco Nero plays two-fisted, taciturn Texas sheriff Burt Sullivan, a man committed to duty and justice but possessed by a desire for revenge. Sullivan, along with his younger brother, crosses the border to bring wealthy and sadistic Mexican crime boss Cisco Delgado (José Suárez) to justice for the murder of their father. Eventually joining forces with a group of Mexican revolutionaries, Sullivan and his brother soon find themselves at the centre of a bloodbath.

Cast

 Franco Nero as Sheriff Burt Sullivan
 Alberto Dell'Acqua (as Cole Kitosch) as Jim Sullivan
 José Suárez (as José Suarez) as Cisco Delgado
 Elisa Montés (as Elisa Montes) as Dancing Mulatta
 José Guardiola as McLeod
 Livio Lorenzon as Alcalde Miguel, the Mayor
 Hugo Blanco as Pedro
 Luigi Pistilli as Hernandez, the Lawyer
 Antonella Murgia as Burt's Mother in Flashback
 Gino Pernice as Bank Employee
 Giovanni Ivan Scratuglia (as Ivan Scratuglia) as Dick, Burt's Deputy
 Silvana Bacci as Paquita, the Barmaid
 Remo De Angelis as Juan, Delgado Henchman
 Mario Novelli as Bounty Hunter
 Enrico Chiappafreddo as Outlaw 
 Lucio De Santis as McLeod Henchman

Production
Texas, Adios, like many Spaghetti Westerns, was shot in the Spanish province Almería. Franco Nero, in his comments on the Anchor Bay DVD, mentions that the Texas, Adios shoot took place not far from where Sergio Leone was filming The Good, The Bad, and the Ugly at the same time. Nero and Clint Eastwood spent time between shots socializing. There are two actor who appeared in both films, who are Livio Lorenzon, and Luigi Pistilli.

Release
Texas, Adios was released in August 1966.

References

External links

 
 Westernfilm

1966 films
1966 Western (genre) films
Spaghetti Western films
Films directed by Ferdinando Baldi
Films shot in Almería
Films scored by Antón García Abril
1960s Italian-language films
1960s Italian films